Tall al-’Umayri is an archaeological dig site in western Jordan that dates from the Early Bronze Age (3200–2100 BCE) to the Hellenistic period (323–30 BCE). It is located near the modern capital of Amman, and is significant for its well-preserved evidence of a temple, as well as archaeological evidence of a network of small farms believed to produce wine. Excavations were proceeding .

Location 
The site sits atop a low ridge between the Queen Alia Airport highway and Amman National Park, c. 2900 feet above sea level. While the location offers few natural defenses, the location was probably selected to take advantage of a natural spring that flowed as recently as the 1930s according to local historian Raouf Abujaber. It appears that this would have been the only reliable water source for travelers between Amman and Madaba.

Excavation 
The site was first noted by Charles Warren in 1867, but was apparently not visited again by archaeologists until the Hisban regional survey in 1976. It has been the subject of several large-scale digs beginning in 1984 under the auspices of the Madaba Plains Project, which by 2010 had uncovered over 4,000 artifacts and 50,000 pieces of pottery.

Chronology 
Though the site appears never to have had more than few dozen buildings, archaeological artifacts have been recovered from 21 different strata indicating that the site has been occupied for all but 1200 years since the early Bronze Age (~3200 BCE) to the present, with a few flints and cherts from even earlier. A dolmen from this earliest period contains disarticulated skeletons from at least 20 people, along with several associated structures and pottery fragments. This phase of occupation peaked c. 2500 BCE based on the ruins of several houses and streets, before declining to nothing by 2200 BCE.

The site was recolonized and fortified with a 5m-deep moat topped by a 5m-tall rampart c. 1600 BCE, but there is no clear evidence it was occupied between 1550 and 1350 BCE. A large, well-preserved, five-room, two-story structure built in the Late Bronze Age (c. 1300 BCE) has been the subject of some debate among archaeologists. It contained hundreds of unburnt animal bones, a cult-wall built around 5 natural standing stones, and an Asherah figurine suggesting it was a temple; but also contained considerable areas full of domestic artifacts more in keeping with a palatial residence. Three substantial four room structures typical of the early Iron Age though slightly predating them (c. 1200 BCE) were built about a century later, and appear to have met a violent end: in addition to numerous kitchen and farmyard implements, the charred skeletons of four people and discarded weaponry were discovered within the burned ruins of the house.

Occupation by a distinct culture begins again c. 1050 BCE, as inferred from a change in the pottery style. The evidence suggests a fairly sparse population for the next four centuries. However, in c. 600 BCE a major administrative complex was built at 'Umayri, apparently under the patronage of the Ammonite king Ba'alyasha' or Baalis, whose name was found on several seals from this stratum. Artifacts bearing a stamp with the word "'Ammon" written in Aramaic persist until c. 400 BCE, well into the Persian Era. After a two century hiatus, the site apparently persisted as a farmstead built around the spring from 200 BCE to 135 CE. A tomb with a Greek inscription and a plastered ritual pool from the time period indicate connections to other Mediterranean cultures. After 350 CE, numerous pottery fragments, sherds, and wall fragments indicate it was at least transiently occupied during the Byzantine and Islamic periods, and possibly by the Bedouin into the 20th century.

See also

 Jericho#Stone Age: Tell es-Sultan and spring
 Madaba#Archaeological finds

References

External links 
 The Madaba Plains Project
 Database of artifacts on opendig.org
ACOR Digital Archive- Tel Umeiri

Archaeological sites in Jordan